Francois Anker (born 12 July 1961) is a South African cricketer. He played in one first-class match for Eastern Province in 1987/88.

See also
 List of Eastern Province representative cricketers

References

External links
 

1961 births
Living people
South African cricketers
Eastern Province cricketers
People from Kouga Local Municipality